Imade Kadro (born 17 August 1958) is a Syrian weightlifter. He competed in the men's flyweight event at the 1980 Summer Olympics.

References

1958 births
Living people
Syrian male weightlifters
Olympic weightlifters of Syria
Weightlifters at the 1980 Summer Olympics
Place of birth missing (living people)